The four-letter abbreviation GOTS may have several meanings, depending on context:

 Global Organic Textile Standard, a non-profit organic certification; see Sustainable fashion
Government off-the-shelf
Ghost of the sun

See also
NASCAR Gander Outdoors Truck Series (NGOTS)